Iranian singer-songwriter and producer Shervin Hajipour has released thirty-three songs, three soundtrack songs, four music videos, forty-eight unreleased songs and three songs as featured artist. After auditioning in New Era on March 22, 2019 with "Maybe Paradise" which he himself wrote and performed, he released the song as his debut single on all platforms and gained recognition among Iranian young generation. After releasing many songs, he released his worldwide hit "For" on September 28, 2022. The song was inspired by the Death of Mahsa Amini. It was first released on Hajipour's Instagram account and it was taken down from the platform in less than 48 hours following Hajipour's arrest by the authorities on September 29. In less than 48 hours the song received about 40 million views. It was later described as "the anthem" of the Mahsa Amini protests. Due to Hajipour's rising popularity, his other songs including "After Us", "The Spring Came" and "Close Your Eyes" went viral and became popular among fans.

Released songs

As featured artist

Soundtrack songs

Unreleased songs

Music videos

References 

Pop music discographies
Discographies